Newmancollege (or Newman College) is a comprehensive Roman Catholic secondary school in Breda, the Netherlands. It was established in 1959 as an HBS (Hogereburgerschool), and was merged with Gymnasium Ypelaar in 1973 and Mavo Hoge Vugt in 1991.

In 2005 it had around 1200 students in grades 1–6.

The school is named after the English theologian and convert to Catholicism Cardinal Newman (1801-1890).

External links 
 school website
 school report (in Dutch)

Educational institutions established in 1959
1959 establishments in the Netherlands
Christian schools in the Netherlands
Secondary schools in the Netherlands
Schools in North Brabant
Buildings and structures in Breda